The tenth season of Modern Family debuted on September 26, 2018 on ABC. The season was produced by 20th Century Fox Television, Steven Levitan Productions, and Picador Productions, with creators Steven Levitan and Christopher Lloyd as showrunners. Modern Family was renewed for its tenth season in May 2017. The season concluded on May 8, 2019 and contained 22 episodes. 

In January 2018, creators Levitan and Lloyd stated that the tenth season would most likely be the series' final although later in August 2018, it was reported that ABC were in discussions to renew the series for a potential 18-episode eleventh and final season. The series was renewed for an eleventh and final season on February 5, 2019.

Cast

Main
 Ed O'Neill as Jay Pritchett
 Sofía Vergara as Gloria Pritchett
 Julie Bowen as Claire Dunphy
 Ty Burrell as Phil Dunphy
 Jesse Tyler Ferguson as Mitchell Pritchett
 Eric Stonestreet as Cameron Tucker
 Sarah Hyland as Haley Dunphy
 Ariel Winter as Alex Dunphy
 Nolan Gould as Luke Dunphy
 Rico Rodriguez as Manny Delgado
 Aubrey Anderson-Emmons as Lily Tucker-Pritchett
 Jeremy Maguire as Joe Pritchett

Recurring
 Chris Geere as Arvin Fennerman
 Reid Ewing as Dylan Marshall
 Marcello Reyes as Calhoun Johnson

Guest

 Dan Levy as Jonah
 Ben Schwartz as Nick
 Hillary Anne Matthews as Sherry Shaker
 Jimmy Tatro as Bill
 Shelley Long as Dede Pritchett (voiceover only)
 Fred Willard as Frank Dunphy 
 Mira Sorvino as Nicole Rosemary Page
 Andrew Daly as Principal Brown
 Rob Riggle as Gil Thorpe 
 Ed Begley, Jr. as Jerry
 Amanda Payton as Laura
 Steve Monroe as Santa
 Gerald Downey as Jim
 Dana Powell as Pam Tucker
 Rachel Bay Jones as Farrah Marshall
 Sedona Fuller as Betty
 London Fuller as Janice
 Avery Tiu Essex as Young Claire
 Philip Anthony Rodriguez as Tim
 Tessa Auberjonois as Nancy
 Nathan Lane as Pepper Saltzman
 Christian Barillas as Ronaldo
 Patty Guggenheim as Danielle
 Lindsay Mendez as Bel Air Black Widow/The Monrovia Mangler
 Kylen Deporter as Alexei
 Desi Dennis Dylan as Foreperson
 Kamryn Kunody as Christina
 Eric Tiede as Desmond 
 Scott Deckart as Evan 
 Abby Roberge as Ben 
 Christine Garver as Anna
 Josh Brener as Carl
 Bill Parks as Park Ranger
 Charles Janasz as Sir Kenneth
 Greta Jung as Mia
 Shanon-Ann Minkley as Mindy
 Frankie A. Rodriguez as Eduardo
 Joshua Hoover as Wayne
 Anne Stedman as Allison #1
 Antonia Jones as Allison #2
 Elizabeth Sandy as Janine
 Jack DePew as Chip
 Briga Heelan as Linda
 Dominic Burgess as Nate 
 Greg Pitts as Rusty
 Kimberly Jürgen as Donna
 Patrick Cavanaugh as MC
 Mel Powell as Cam and Mitchell's friend
 Morry Schorr as Club Member
 Lucas Steagall as Binker
 James III as Waiter
 Charles Shaughnessy as Dr. Sieglitz
 Jackie Joseph as Marion
 Amy Pietz as Janice
 Casey Burke as Tina
 Ramiz Monsef as Doctor
 Greg Rikkart as Dr. William
 Eden Rose as Annabelle
 Jack Axelrod as Bert
 Thomas Lennon as Orson Funt
 Virginia Williams as Ashley Walls-Carnegie
 Landon Klotz as Pitkowski 
 Jay Pichardo as Groundskeeper
 Jay Mandyam as Chug
 Tom Everett as Dean
 Kendall Foote as Auctioneer
 Tyler Cook as Ashley's Husband
 Matthew Wrather as Sensei Ron
 Mina Joo as Store Worker
 Joshua Tyler Kelly as Gerald
 Matt Roth as Skip Woosnum
 Chazz Palmenteri as Shorty
 Matthew Risch as Jotham
 Malakai Carey as Robert 
 Ghadir Mounib as Server 
 Jeffrey Richman as Vincent
 Kit McDonough as Piano teacher
 Demi Harman as Tattoo girl

Episodes

Ratings

References

External links
 

2018 American television seasons
2019 American television seasons
10